Holtug Church (Danish: Holtug Kirke) is a church in Holtug on the Stevns Peninsula, Stevns Municipality, Denmark. The church dates from the middle of the 12th century, but only the walls of the nave from the original Romanesque church have survived.

History
The church was constructed from limestone ashlars in the Romanesque style around 1150. In the 15th century, the chancel was replaced with a newer and larger one. A limestone ashlar from the original chancel, which was reused in the south wall of the new one, features the runal inscription Tirad rist ("Tirad wrote [this]"). The tower was added between 1500 and 1525, and the porch from around 1600.

Interior and furnishings

The western cross vault features murals attributed to the so-called Høvelse Master.

The altarpiece is from 1821 and was painted by J.L. Lund. The font was returned to the church in connection with a restoration in 1984. The pulpit is from  1825 and is made of wood. In 1946, it was decorated with paintings of the Evangelists and Paul by Erik Petersen. The organ is a Ramus organ from 1861 and was expanded by Starup in 1932.

Cemetery
The church is surrounded by a cemetery. Notable burials include:
 Jacob Brønnum Scavenius (1749–1820), landowner
 Peder Brønnum Scavenius (1795–1868), landowner and politician
 Jacob Scavenius (1838–1915), landowner and politician
 Harald Scavenius (1873–1939), diplomat and Minister of Foreign Affairs

References

External links
 Magleby Stevns-Holtug Sogn

12th-century churches in Denmark
Churches in Stevns Municipality
Churches in the Diocese of Roskilde
Lutheran churches converted from Roman Catholicism
Limestone churches in Denmark